Canon or Canons may refer to:

Arts and entertainment 

 Canon (fiction), the material accepted as officially written by an author or an ascribed author
 Literary canon, an accepted body of works considered as high culture
 Western canon, the body of high culture literature, music, philosophy, and works of art that is highly valued in the West 
 Canon of proportions, a formally codified set of criteria deemed mandatory for a particular artistic style of figurative art
 Canon (music), a type of composition
 Canon (hymnography), a type of hymn used in Eastern Orthodox Christianity.
 Canon (album), a 2007 album by Ani DiFranco
 Canon (film), a 1964 Canadian animated short
 Canon (game), an online browser-based strategy war game
 Canon (manga), by Nikki
 Canonical plays of William Shakespeare
 The Canon (Natalie Angier book), a 2007 science book by Natalie Angier
 The Canon (podcast), concerning film

Brands and enterprises 
 Canon Inc., a Japanese imaging and optical products corporation
 Château Canon (disambiguation), a number of wineries
 UBM Canon, a media company headquartered in Los Angeles

People
 Canon (rapper) (born 1989)
 Fernando Canon (1860–1938), Filipino revolutionary general, poet, inventor, engineer, musician and chess player
 Lou Canon, stage name of Leanne Greyerbiehl, a Canadian indie pop singer-songwriter

Places
 Canon, Georgia, a city in the United States
 Canons Park, London, UK
 Canon Row, a street in Westminster, London
 Cañon City, Colorado, United States
 Cañon Fiord, on Ellesmere Island in Nunavut, Canada
 Canon Rock, an island in Northern Ireland

Religion 
 Religious text: some religious texts are accepted or categorized as canonical, some non-canonical, and others extracanonical, semi-canonical, deutero-canonical, pre-canonical or post-canonical.
 Biblical canon, a set of texts regarded by a Christian or Jewish community as part of the Bible
Canon law, the whole judicial system in Christian churches
 Canon (canon law), a law or ordinance promulgated by a synod, ecumenical council, or individual bishop (within the canon law system of that Church).
 Canon (clergy), a title of certain Christian priests
 Canon (hymnography), a kind of hymn in Eastern Orthodox Christianity
 Pāli Canon, scriptures of Theravāda Buddhism (these include the Sutta Pitaka, the Vinaya Pitaka and the Abhidhamma Pitaka)

Other uses 
 Canon (basic principle), an accepted body of rules
 Canon, in bellfounding, one or more hanging loops cast integrally with the crown
 The Canon of Medicine, a 1025 CE medical encyclopedia by Ibn Sīnā (Avicenna)
 Canon Yaoundé, a Cameroonian association football club based in the capital city of Yaoundé
 Canons High School, Edgware, Greater London

See also 

 Canaan, a region in the Ancient Near East
 Cannon (disambiguation)
 Canonical, standard or referential form; includes many examples of canons
 Canonization, the act of a pope's declaring a deceased person a saint
 Canyon (disambiguation)
 Kanon (disambiguation)
 Kanoon (disambiguation)
 Qanun (disambiguation)